Veysian Rural District is a rural district (dehestan) in Veysian District, Dowreh County, Lorestan Province, Iran. At the 2006 census, its population was 6,131, in 1,476 families.  The rural district has 32 villages.

References 

Rural Districts of Lorestan Province
Dowreh County